Denis Arndt (born November 23, 1939) is an American actor, best known for his starring role as Alex Priest in the play Heisenberg for which he earned a 2017 Tony Award nomination for Best Actor in a Play.

Life and career
Denis Arndt served in the Vietnam War as a United States Army helicopter pilot, earning a Purple Heart and Commendation Medal. 
After the war, Arndt flew helicopters in Alaska for several years before completing a degree at the University of Washington. He joined the Oregon Shakespeare Festival in Ashland, Oregon where he completed 15 seasons and was a charter member of Seattle's Intiman Theater.

After Kenneth Welsh exited rehearsals of the play Heisenberg, Arndt was cast and joined the Manhattan Theater Club's production, which opened June 3, 2015. The production moved to Broadway's Samuel J. Friedman Theatre on October 13, 2016.

Arndt has also appeared in guest roles on a number of television shows including The Good Fight, Grey's Anatomy, Supernatural and Vanished. He had a regular role on Annie McGuire and recurring roles on Picket Fences and L.A. Law. He has appeared in films including Basic Instinct and How to Make an American Quilt.

Filmography

References

External links
 

1939 births
Living people
United States Army aviators
United States Army personnel of the Vietnam War
University of Washington alumni
American male television actors
20th-century American male actors
21st-century American male actors
American male stage actors
People from Issaquah, Washington
Male actors from Washington (state)